"Dreamland" refers to the fourth and fifth episodes of the sixth season of the science fiction television series The X-Files. Part one first aired on November 29, and part two aired on December 6, 1998, on Fox in the United States and Canada. The episode was written by Vince Gilligan, John Shiban, and Frank Spotnitz, and directed by Kim Manners ("Dreamland") and Michael Watkins ("Dreamland II"). Although dealing with a member of the Men in Black, the episode is largely unconnected to the mythology of The X-Files, and is a "Monster-of-the-Week" story. Part one of "Dreamland" earned a Nielsen household rating of 10.1, being watched by 17.48 million people in its initial broadcast; Part two received a rating of 10 and was watched by 17.01 million people. The episode received mostly mixed reviews from critics, with many reviews critical of the episode's reliance on humor.

The show centers on FBI special agents Fox Mulder (David Duchovny) and Dana Scully (Gillian Anderson) who work on cases linked to the paranormal, called X-Files. Mulder is a believer in the paranormal, while the skeptical Scully has been assigned to debunk his work. In the episode, Mulder and Scully visit Area 51. But when the agents witness the flight of a mysterious craft, Mulder and a member of the Men in Black switch bodies, unbeknownst to the others. In part two, Scully begins to suspect that her partner's strange behavior is more than it appears to be, while Mulder fights to return his life to normal before it is too late.

"Dreamland" became the first non-mythology story to be spread across two episodes. Originally, the writers for the episode contacted Garry Shandling to play the part of Fletcher but he was unavailable for filming. Michael McKean was then cast in his place. The episode is notable for a scene featuring Mulder-as-Fletcher encountering his reflection and proceeding to do the dance from the 1933 Marx Brothers comedy film Duck Soup. The scene required Duchovny and McKean to synchronize their movements perfectly. Dreamland is one of the names used for the Area 51 facility.

Plot

Part one
Fox Mulder (David Duchovny) and Dana Scully (Gillian Anderson) visit the Area 51 installation in Nevada after receiving a tip from an inside source concerning alien spacecraft. As they drive on the highway, the agents are surrounded by Jeeps carrying soldiers led by a Man in Black named Morris Fletcher (Michael McKean). A rumbling noise is heard as a mysterious craft flies overhead and a bright light from the object passes over them. Mulder and Fletcher find that their minds have been swapped into each other's bodies, but nobody else present is aware of this. Fletcher and Scully depart, watched by the soldiers.

Mulder is driven back to Area 51 along with two other Men in Black, Howard Grodin and Jeff Smoodge. After an angry telephone call from Fletcher's wife, Joanne, Mulder—still inside Fletcher's body—goes to Fletcher's home. Instead of sleeping in the bedroom, he decides to sleep downstairs in an easy chair and watch pornography. When he is awoken by Joanne, he mumbles Scully's name. While changing his clothes, Mulder receives a call from Smoodge, who explains that the military has surveyed the wreckage of the craft from the night before, finding one of the human pilots fused into a rock but still alive. Another soldier, Captain Robert McDonough, had switched bodies with an elderly Hopi woman, Lana Chee, as evident from McDonough's aberrant behavior.

Mulder calls Scully and tries to explain that he's the real Mulder. Scully does not believe him and asks Fletcher—in Mulder's body—to pick up and listen to the conversation. Fletcher decides they should immediately report this incident, which further confuses Scully. She goes to Mulder's apartment (where Fletcher is having a tryst with Assistant Director Kersh's assistant) and tells him that they traced the call to a payphone near Area 51; she suspects it is Mulder's informant. Fletcher is indifferent to this news and Scully yells at him, sensing that his behavior is very strange and his lack of concern for the X-Files is completely out of character.

Deciding to investigate on her own, Scully drives through the desert towards Area 51. She stops at a burned out gas station and finds a penny and a dime fused together. Later, when Scully arrives at Fletcher's house, Mulder tries desperately to convince her that he is really Mulder. Scully remains skeptical and thinks that any information Mulder describes could be obtained in other ways. Mulder tells Scully that he will provide proof, but Fletcher, having eavesdropped on the conversation, calls his old office posing as Mulder to inform them of the source of the leak—Mulder posing as Fletcher. Military police arrive at the appointed hour, and Mulder is dragged away, desperately pleading with Scully. Mulder asks if he would turn in an informant to the authorities in this manner as he is carried away, and Scully begins to realize that he may be telling the truth.

Part two
As Mulder—in Fletcher's body—is dragged away by the soldiers, Scully begins to question whether his story about the body-swap was true. Fletcher—in Mulder's body—approaches Scully and apologizes for telling Kersh; she feigns acceptance of it. After being reprimanded, Fletcher arranges a dinner date with Scully at Mulder's apartment. Meanwhile, Mulder is confined in a cell next to the mind-switched Lana Chee. Military police take Mulder to a meeting with General Wegman, Grodin and Smoodge, who believe that Mulder-as-Fletcher was trying to defraud the FBI, not help them. Mulder bluffs his way through the meeting, claiming that the real proof is safe and that he did not tell them about the scheme because he did not know if he could trust his colleagues, thinking any one of them could be the source of the leak. Mulder returns to Fletcher's house and tells Joanne that he is Agent Fox Mulder, but Joanne thinks her husband must be undergoing a mid-life crisis.

At Mulder's apartment, Scully reveals to Fletcher-as-Mulder that she is on to the body swap, demanding to know how to restore Mulder to his own body. Mulder's informant calls again and Scully forces Fletcher to set up a meeting. Mulder, Joanne, Fletcher and Scully arrive at a bar in Rachel, Nevada, where the informant is revealed to be General Wegman. Wegman admits that he sabotaged the UFO, but maintains that he only tried to merely disable the stealth module so that Mulder could see it. Wegman gives Fletcher, who he thinks is Mulder, a flight data recorder in a paper bag. Meanwhile, Mulder leaves and talks to Scully in the car. Later, Mulder and Fletcher meet in the bar's bathroom and argue about the flight data recorder. As they argue, Wegman enters the bathroom and discovers the two. Mulder meets with Wegman to discuss the UFO. Wegman believes that now that Fletcher knows Wegman's identity, when restored to his own body, Fletcher will turn him in. Wegman explains that he hoped that Mulder could explain whether aliens actually exist; apparently the craft are simply given to the military without knowing where they are from or how they work.

After the fiasco at the bar, Mulder and Scully meet. She sadly tells Mulder that she does not think he and Fletcher can be returned to their own bodies. However, soon after that, the warp caused by the alien craft begins to snap back and repair the natural order of the universe. Grodin, realizing that everything will be fixed naturally, gathers up Lana Chee and Captain McDonough. Scully and Fletcher arrive at Fletcher's home, and see Mulder standing by the moving truck. Joanne berates Mulder about Scully but he insists that he and Fletcher have swapped bodies. Fletcher goes to help Joanne move a chair and confesses that Mulder is telling the truth, telling her enough details about their past to convince her he is Fletcher. Smoodge and a group of soldiers appear at the house and detain Mulder, Fletcher, Scully and the flight data recorder in their car.

Grodin explains to the group that he is restoring everything and that he reversed the body-swap between Chee and McDonough. The warp passes over them and the past few days are rewritten. Mulder and Fletcher are restored to their own bodies and returned to the moment when Fletcher's troops pulled them over on the highway. This time, no ship passes overhead and the agents leave uneventfully. Afterwards, Scully calls from FBI headquarters to tell Mulder that they have escaped reprimand from Kersh for going to Nevada. Scully opens her desk drawer to place a file inside and finds the penny and dime that were fused together from the event at the gas station, indicating that while some things have reversed themselves, not everything has. Mulder enters his apartment and finds that Fletcher has completely reorganized and cleaned his apartment. The agents are left to puzzle over their recollection of events.

Production

Casting

Garry Shandling was initially sought out to play the part of Fletcher. However, he was unavailable because he was filming the movie Town and Country, but he would later appear in the seventh season episode "Hollywood A.D.", playing a fictional version of himself. The production staff began looking for a replacement, going through, as the show's casting director Rick Millikan put it, "lists and lists" of potential actors. Vince Gilligan noted, however, that McKean was "at the top of our list from the beginning". McKean was very happy to play the part, although he did specifically ask the writers not to kill off his character.

Julia Vera was cast in the role of Lana Chee, the Hopi woman whose mind is switched with that of a young air force pilot. In order to age her, Vera wore special makeup and facial appliances; special contact lenses were also crafted, giving her eyes a clouded look. The scene in which she flicks a cigarette butt into Mulder's lap took five takes to get because the lenses obstructed her vision.

Filming

Production for "Dreamland" necessitated the series to temporarily relocate to "Club Ed", a movie ranch near Lancaster, California. Because Club Ed was almost 100 miles away from the Fox Studios, most of the show's crew had to camp out in motels located in the desert. Because this filming location was outside the Los Angeles studio zone, Fox was required to pay all actors and production staff members a per diem covering the cost of meals and motel reservations, leading to budget constraints. Half-way through the episode's production, Duchovny was reported as saying, "When is this show moving back to Los Angeles?" Within days, the crew had made T-shirts that humorously featured the question.

Many of the locations in the episode were created from scratch, either through conventional means or through computer technology. For instance, the gas station that explodes was erected by the props department outside Lancaster and fitted with gas pumps from a station that had recently closed. The store was then loaded with merchandise and then rigged for detonation. After the set was destroyed and filming ceased, the remnants were quickly cleared away. According to set decorator Duke Tomasick: "It was if the whole thing never even existed". Area 51, the government airplanes, and the alien craft were all created with CGI technology by visual effects producer Bill Millar. Originally, the time warp effect resembled a "blue sheet", according to producer John Shiban, sans the blurring effect visible in the finished episode. Eventually, the production crew felt that this effect was not effective, and so the footage was blurred in order to create a more convincing "molecular transferal" effect.

Other locations were either real, or were filmed with the use of stand-ins. The gate for the Area 51 set, for instance, was filmed at a desolate stretch of fence near the Los Angeles/San Bernardino County division. The scene was later supplemented with a matte painting to complete the effect. While there really is a Little A'Le'Inn cafe in Rachel, Nevada, along Route 375, neither the outside or the inside of this location was featured in the episode.

Choreography

The scene where Mulder-as-Fletcher encounters his reflection and proceeds to dance is an homage to the Marx Brothers comedy film Duck Soup (1933). Initially, the producers thought about creating the scene with expensive digital effects. Duchovny and McKean, however, volunteered to do it the "old fashioned way" by choreographing their moves so that they would be in-sync. Duchovny and McKean each watched Duck Soup and then practiced their routine for a week and a half. During filming, a metronome was used so that the two actors could keep time with each other; this ticking was then removed during post-production. The effect was furthered by a unique set that was actually two bedrooms, both mirror images of each other. The only part of this dance that required any CGI was when Mulder fogs up the mirror with his breath.

Reception

Ratings
"Dreamland" first aired in the United States on November 29, and "Dreamland II" aired on December 6, 1998. The first part of the episode earned a Nielsen rating of 10.1, with a 15 share, meaning that roughly 10.1 percent of all television-equipped households, and 15 percent of households watching television, were tuned in to the episode. It was viewed by 17.48 million people. The second part received a 10 rating, with a 15 share. It was subsequently viewed by 17.01 million people. The first part aired in the United Kingdom and Ireland on Sky1 on March 28, 1999, and the second part aired on April 4; part one received 0.73 million viewers and was the fourth most watched episode that week, and part two later received 0.88 million viewers and was the second most watched episode that week, after an episode of Friends. Fox promoted the first part of the episode with the tagline "what if you could discover the truth by living inside another man's body?" They promoted the second part of the episode with the line "Can he get back?"

Reviews

The episode received mostly mixed reviews from critics, with many commenting on the episode's reliance on humor. In a review of part one, a critic from Knight Ridder wrote, "As disorienting as this body transfer had to be for Mulder, the experience provided amusing television. And that seems to be a problem for some X-Files fans. Knowing that the human population's survival is imperiled by the colonization plans of a fierce extraterrestrial race, a large number of X-Philes want the show to focus on our heroes' efforts to come to the rescue". The newspaper's review of Part 2 was much more negative, with the article saying "by the end of the latest X-Files episode, we were wishing we could push a reset button on Dreamland II, just to forget some of the silly stuff that transpired in this show". Robert Shearman and Lars Pearson, in their book Wanting to Believe: A Critical Guide to The X-Files, Millennium & The Lone Gunmen, rated the episode two stars out of five and noted that the episode lacked "structure and point". Paula Vitaris from Cinefantastique gave both episodes mixed reviews, awarding the first part two-and-a-half stars out of four, and the second part two stars. Vitaris was unhappy with the amount of comedy used in the episode, noting that once Mulder visited Fletcher's house, "the comedy turns sour": she argued that the members of Fletcher's family were examples of caricatures. Despite this, she praised the scene featuring the murder of the gas station attendant, claiming that "for a moment, this episode really clicks". Vitaris, in her review for part two, called the episode "purely illogical", although she noted it did feature "minor fun", pointing out the scene wherein Scully catches Fletcher by handcuffing him.

Not all reviews were completely negative. Zack Handlen from The A.V. Club wrote positively of the first part of the episode's humor and awarded it a B+. Handlen noted that "the context of seeing actors in the wrong places" is "what’s funny about the episode". However, he did slightly criticize the episode's padding—specifically Nora Dunn's role as Fletcher's wife and the Duck Soup mirror gag—but argued that "for every bit that doesn’t play in the episode, there are three that do." Emily VanDerWerff, also from The A.V. Club, gave the second half of the episode a B− and wrote, "I have basically nothing to add to what Zack said about the first 'Dreamland' last week. 'Dreamland II' is a fairly unnecessary hour of television, and there’s no reason this logy two-parter couldn't have become a much tighter one-hour episode." Tom Kessenich, in his book Examination: An Unauthorized Look at Seasons 6–9 of the X-Files wrote that "my final judgement on 'Dreamland' [part one] is that I enjoyed the entertainment value it presented. It was fun and I'm not one to begrudge a little romp now and then." Kessenich, however, did note that the second part "felt strung out". Den of Geek writer Juliette Harrisson, however, saw the episode in a more positive light and said, "Season six included some more excellent episodes only peripherally related to the main story arc, [such as] Dreamland parts one and two". Kerry Fall from DVD Journal wrote positively of the episodes and described them, together as "one of the best episodes in years". Gareth Wigmore of TV Zone gave the first part of the episode an 8 out of 10 rating and highlighted the "strong story-telling, clever dialogue, and good acting". Earl Cressey from DVD Talk concluded that both "Dreamland" parts one and two were among the "highlights of season six". Topless Robot named "Dreamland" the fourth funniest episode of the series.

Footnotes

Bibliography

External links

 
 

1998 American television episodes
Fiction about body swapping
Television episodes set in Nevada
Television episodes written by Vince Gilligan
The X-Files (season 6) episodes